Kasper Pedersen (born 13 January 1993) is a Danish professional footballer who plays as a defender for Stabæk Fotball.

Club career
Pedersen started his youth career at Aabybro IF, before moving to Jetsmark IF – a club affiliated with Aalborg Boldspilklub (AaB). At the age of 12 he joined the AaB youth team. He made his senior debut for the reserve team in the Denmark Series, the fourth tier of Danish football.

In the spring of 2013, he made his first team debut in the Danish Superliga where he also scored his first official goal as a senior.

In the 2015–16 pre-season Kasper signed a 4-year contract with AaB in which he was considered a permanent replacement for defender Rasmus Thelander, who was sold to Greek Panathinaikos on the same day.

On 15 January 2021, Pedersen joined Danish 1st Division club Esbjerg fB on a deal until June 2023. On 26 July 2021, his contract was terminated by mutual agreement. The following day, Pedersen signed with Norwegian club Stabæk Fotball.

Club statistics
.

Honours

Club
AaB
Danish Superliga (1): 2013–14
Danish Cup (1): 2013–14

References

1993 births
Living people
Danish men's footballers
Danish expatriate men's footballers
AaB Fodbold players
Danish Superliga players
Association football defenders
People from Jammerbugt Municipality
Jammerbugt FC players
Esbjerg fB players
Stabæk Fotball players
Danish expatriate sportspeople in Norway
Expatriate footballers in Norway
Sportspeople from the North Jutland Region